Pentacalia pailasensis is a species of flowering plant in the family Asteraceae. It is found only in Ecuador. Its natural habitat is subtropical or tropical moist montane forests. It is threatened by habitat loss.

References

Further reading
 Robinson, Harold; Jose Cuatrecasas. (1993) "New Species of Pentacalia (Senecioneae: Asteraceae) from Ecuador, Peru, and Bolivia" Novon 3 (3): 284–301.

pailasensis
Endangered plants
Taxonomy articles created by Polbot